Charles Leigh may refer to:

 Charles Leigh (American football)  (1945–2006), National Football League running back
 Charles Leigh (physician) (1662–1701), English physician and naturalist
 Charles Leigh (British Army officer) (1748–1815), British general
 Charles Leigh (librarian) (1871–?), English academic librarian
 Charles Leigh (merchant) (died 1605), English merchant and voyager
 Charles Leigh (1686–1749), British Member of the UK Parliament for Bedfordshire, Warwick, and Higham Ferrers
 Charles Leigh (died 1836), British Member of the UK Parliament for New Ross

See also 
 Charles Lee (disambiguation)